Massoud Mehrabi (1954 – 31 August 2020) was an Iranian journalist, writer and caricaturist. He studied cinema at the Faculty of Dramatic Arts of the University of Art (1977–1982). and later passed a Film Production Management course at the Industrial Management Institute (1983–84). Mehrabi started his professional career as a journalist in 1970, writing articles for several papers. From 1982 to 1989, he worked at the economic desk of the Iranian National Television.

He died at of a heart attack at 66.

Career
Massoud Mehrabi wrote books on cinema; his The History of Iranian Cinema (1983) was a best-selling book about the Iranian cinema. His later book, A Hundred Years of Film Adverts and Film Posters in Iran (2012), is a bilingual study of a subject little covered previously.

Massoud Mehrabi's career roles included being the president and publisher of:

1. Film monthly, in Persian, a film magazine in Iran. Founded in 1981, when there was no other serious film journal  and all pre-Revolutionary film journals had ceased to publish for several years, it attracted a number of young film devotees to its staff as writers and critics, many of whom went on to publish magazines of their own. 

2. Iranian Cinema Yearbook in Persian (published annually since 1992), which covers all the important film events of the year, and reviews every new film released in Iran. 

3. Film International] quarterly, in English (founded 1993), which played a significant role in introducing the Iranian cinema, past and present, to the western audience.

Massoud Mehrabi, always interested in caricatures, was a caricaturist and a graphic artist for a variety of Iranian publications since 1970 and participated in several Iranian and international caricature exhibitions.

Bibliography

Books on cinema 
 One Hundred + Five Years of Film Adverts and Film Posters in Iran, 2014
 
 Beyond the Dreams Wall: Travelogue of International Film Festivals, 2010
  ; 2nd to 10th editions, 1985–2006
 Bibliography of Cinema in Iran, From the Beginning to the Year 2000, 2001
 A Guide to Iranian Documentary  Films, From the Beginning Till 1997, 1992
 Film Posters, 1992
 Bibliography of Cinema in Iran, (Vol. II, from 1988 to 1991), 1992
 A Guide to Iranian Short Films, 1990
 A Guide to Iranian Films for Children & Youth, 1989
 Bibliography of Cinema in Iran, (Vol. I, From the Beginning to 1988), 1988

 Books on caricatures 
 Looking between the Shades, 1992
 Movie Caricatures (compiled by), 1984
 Teeth, 1982
 Black Caricatures, 1981
 Ladders without Roofs (Roofless Ladders)'', 1977

Exhibitions

Individual exhibitions 
 The Classic Gallery, Isfahan, 1993
 The Golestan Gallery, Tehran, 1991
 The Museum of Ethnology, Ghazvin, 1981
 The Khane-ye-Aftab Gallery, Tehran, 1981
 The Museum of Contemporary Arts, Tehran, 1980
 The Khane-ye-Aftab Gallery, Tehran, 1979
 Open Show in Paris, 1979
 The Vessal Gallery, Shiraz, 1978
 Khane-ye-Aftab Gallery, Tehran, 1977
 The Takht-e Jamshid Gallery, Tehran, 1976
 The Sheikh Gallery, Tehran, 1976
 The Naghsh Gallery, Tehran, 1975

Group exhibitions 
 Museum of Contemporary Arts, Tehran, 1983
 Organizer of the First Group Exhibition of Iranian Caricaturists at Iran-America Society, Tehran, 1978
 The Goethe Institute, Tehran, 1978
 The Takht-e Jamshid Gallery, Tehran, 1977
 The Naghsh Gallery, Tehran, 1977
 The Obeid Gallery, Tehran University, 1976
 Joint Exhibition with Canadian Caricaturists at 'The House of Iran', Montreal, 1976

Participation in International Exhibitions of Caricature 
 Japan, Iran, 1995
 Turkey, Japan, Italy, 1994
 Turkey, France, Italy, Japan, Iran, 1993
 Japan, Turkey, 1992
 Japan, Turkey, Belgium, 1991
 Japan, Turkey, Italy, France, 1990
 Japan, Netherlands, Belgium, Italy, 1989
 Turkey, Belgium, Japan, 1989
 Japan, Canada, Poland, Belgium, Turkey, 1987
 Turkey, Poland, Belgium, 1986
 Japan, Turkey, Belgium, Canada, 1985
 Japan, Turkey, Belgium, 1984
 Japan, Belgium, Poland, Netherlands, 1983
 Japan, Canada, 1982
 Greece, Yugoslavia, 1980
 Canada, Greece, 1987
 Canada, Yugoslavia, Italy, 1977
 Berlin, Poland, Canada, Yugoslavia, 1976

Awards 
 A recipient of a plaque of  Appreciation from the Association of Critics and Writers of Iranian Cinema, 2017
 A recipient of a plaque of  Appreciation and the Golden Pen Award from the 4th Festival of Film Books 
by the House of Cinema (2014) as an outstanding writer and author of Reference Books.
 Honorary Award, House of Iranian Cinema Festival, 2007
 Many Diplomas from Various International Exhibitions of Caricature / 1975–1992
 Silver Medal and 200,000 yen, from Yomiuri Shimbun, Japan / 1983
 Bronze Medal, from Yomiuri Shimbun, Japan / 1982

Contributions as a jury 
 Jury member of the 1st and 4th International Tehran Cartoon Biennial – 1993, 1999.

As a publisher and designer of books 
 The Duties of Assistant Director – Translated and Adapted by Mohammad Haghighat – 1994
 Wind Blows Anywhere it Likes – by Babak Ahmadi – 1992
 Conducted by Morteza Hannaneh – by Touraj Zahedi – 1991
 Tarkovsky – by Babak Ahmadi – 1990
 Understanding Movies – Translated by Iraj Karimi – 1990
 Film Appreciation – Translated by Bahman Taheri – 1989
 Film as Film – Translated by Abdollah Tarbiat – 1989
 Literature and Cinema – a group work – 1989
 The Age of Comic Films – a group work – 1988
 Paradjanov – a group work – 1988
 Yasujiro Ozu – a group work – 1988
 François Truffaut – by Hamid Hodania – 1987
 Acting for Films – a group work – 1987
 The Characteristics and Aims of Film Criticism – 1986
And cover designs for numerous books

Works in other newspapers and periodicals as writer, caricaturist and graphist 
 Soroush weekly, 1982
 Sanat-e Haml-o-Naghl monthly, 1982
 Fokahyoun weekly, 1981
 Tebb-o Darou weekly, 1981
 Jahangard weekly/monthly, 1980
 Ferdowsi weekly, 1980
 Zan-e Rouz weekly, 1980
 Pirouzi monthly, 1980
 Kayhan daily, 1987
 Ayandegan daily, 1978
 Donya-ye Varzesh weekly, 1977
 Javanan weekly, 1977
 Talaash monthly, 1977
 Rastakhiz daily, 1975
 Mardom daily, 1975
 Caricature weekly, 1971
 Economic Desk of Iranian Television (IRIB)/ 1982–1989
 Essays, articles and art reviews in various papers/ 1970–1995

Gallery

External links 
 Massoud Mehrabi / website
 Books by Massoud Mehrabi, Abebooks 
 Massoud Mehrabi's List of Published Works
 Massoud Mehrabi, WorldCat
 Film Magazine / Website
 Massoud Mehrabi's Biography
 Film International Website
 Massoud Mehrabi, IMDb

Notes 

 

Iranian journalists
Iranian writers
Iranian cartoonists
Iranian caricaturists
2020 deaths
1954 births
Iranian magazine founders